Banja Luka Zalužani Airfield is a recreational airfield on the northern outskirts of the city of Banja Luka, the second largest city in Bosnia and Herzegovina.

Accidents and incidents
On 20 May 2012, five people were killed when a sports plane, a Cessna 182 owned by Parachute Club Banja Luka, crashed in a field at Zalužani Airport. There were no survivors, and the victims were identified as a pilot, a parachuting instructor and three people who were undergoing parachuting training. The cause is under investigation.

See also
 Banja Luka International Airport

References

Airports in Bosnia and Herzegovina
Transport in Republika Srpska
Economy of Banja Luka
Buildings and structures in Republika Srpska